Andrei Vladimirovich Sidenko (born 30 August 1995) is a Russian football player.

Club career
He played his first game for the main squad of FC Rostov on 24 September 2015 in a Russian Cup game against FC Tosno.

References

External links
 
 
 
 Player's profile at Crimean Football Union

1995 births
Living people
Russian footballers
Russian expatriate footballers
Expatriate footballers in Belarus
Association football midfielders
Crimean Premier League players
FC Rostov players
FC Rubin Yalta players
FC Dynamo Stavropol players
FC Orsha players
FC Veles Moscow players
FC TSK Simferopol players